For the patent holder for the Microprocessor, see: Microprocessor#Gilbert Hyatt (1970)

Gilbert Hyatt ( 1761 – 17 September 1823) was instrumental in founding a township in Lower Canada, settling it and starting a village that became Sherbrooke, Quebec.

References 
 Gilbert Hyatt - Dictionary of Canadian Biography Online

Settlers of Canada
Year of birth uncertain
1823 deaths
People from Schenectady, New York
People from Sherbrooke